Little Fuzzy is a 1962 science fiction novel by H. Beam Piper, now in public domain. It was nominated for the 1963 Hugo Award for Best Novel.

The story revolves around determining whether a small furry species discovered on the planet Zarathustra is sapient. It features a mild libertarianism that emphasizes sincerity and honesty.

The book was followed by a sequel, Fuzzy Sapiens (original title The Other Human Race) published in 1964, the same year that Piper died by suicide.

In the wake of Piper's suicide, rumor spread of a lost "second sequel"; in 1981, at the behest of Ace Books, William Tuning produced the critically acclaimed Fuzzy Bones. Ace also hired Ardath Mayhar in 1982 to write Golden Dreams: A Fuzzy Odyssey, which tells the events of Little Fuzzy from the viewpoint of the Fuzzies (or Gashta, as they call themselves).

Later, Piper's lost manuscript was discovered. It was published in 1984 as Fuzzies and Other People. 

Wolfgang Diehr wrote or co-wrote three sequels, published by Pequod Press: Fuzzy Ergo Sum (2011), Caveat Fuzzy (2012), and Fuzzy Conundrum (2016, with well-known Piper historian John F. Carr).

In 2011, John Scalzi published Fuzzy Nation, which he described as a "reboot" of Piper's original.

Plot summary
Protagonist Jack Holloway lives a solitary life mining valuable "sunstones" in the wilderness of the planet Zarathustra, managed by Victor Grego's Chartered Zarathustra Company, which built colonial outposts there and now reaps the benefits of the planet's resources. One day, Holloway meets a small golden-furred humanoid whom he names "Little Fuzzy", who soon introduces Holloway to his family. Holloway cares for the Fuzzies and spreads word of their apparently intelligent behavior. When the Company discovers that the Fuzzies' intelligence may qualify them as a sapient species, the Company moves against them, as the discovery of sapient native Zarathustrans would turn the planet into a protected aboriginal zone, install a proper government there, and deprive the Company of its complete control of the planet's resources.

Leonard Kellogg, one of Grego's staff, manages a team of scientists working to legally disprove the Fuzzies' sapience at all costs. Holloway suspects Kellogg's intentions and resists him. When Kellogg kills a Fuzzy in anger, Holloway has him charged with murder, leaving the Fuzzies' sapience to be determined in court. In the midst of the proceedings, it is proven that Fuzzies have at least the mental capacity of a ten-year-old human child and speak to each other ultrasonically. Kellogg kills himself in his cell, but the prosecution continues, and the court officially rules that the Fuzzies are sapient beings, invalidating the Company's charter. Holloway and his allies are given Fuzzy-related positions in the new government.

Sequels 

The second book, Fuzzy Sapiens, deals with the newly charterless Zarathustra Company and its gradual cooperation with the planet's new governor to ensure chaos does not take over the planet, while the Fuzzies attach themselves to individual human guardians including members of the Company staff. Victor Grego, one of the villains of the first book and the manager of the CZC, finds a Fuzzy in his private apartment in the Company tower, adopts him, names him Diamond, and become a firm supporter of the Fuzzies. This enables the Company to cooperate with the new planetary government headed up by naturalist Ben Rainsford and work with the Native Affairs Commission headed up by Jack Holloway. It becomes clear that criminals are using the irregular status of the government and of the Company to attack it and steal sunstones. With the help of the Fuzzies, the thieves are thwarted. There is also further exploration into the biology of the Fuzzies, and it is established that the Fuzzies may be in a biological dead end, doomed to extinction without aid from the humans.

The third book, Fuzzy Bones by William Tuning, suggests that the remarkable affinity of all Fuzzies for the survival ration "Extraterrestrial Type Three" (a.k.a. "Extee 3", "estefee", or "hoksu-fusso", meaning "wonderful food") does not coincide with the composition of Zarathustran soil, a contradiction of Garrett's Theorem. A third significant Fuzzy character is developed called Starwatcher. Little Fuzzy, Diamond, and Starwatcher become the clear leaders in working with humans. Among other things, an alien spaceship is discovered on Beta Continent, and evidence that the Fuzzies are not in fact native to Zarathustra  emerges, which raises a variety of legal and philosophical questions. Tuning introduces a number of memorable characters, including Christiana Stone, Grego's Fuzzy-Sitter-in-Chief; Reverend Thomas Aquinas Gordon, aka "The Rev;" Master Gunnery Sergeant Philip Helton, TFMC; and Liana Bell, a CZC scientist invited by the researchers of Holloway's Fuzzy Institute to join them in their research.

Golden Dream by Ardath Mayhar fits with these three books in terms of the general plot and relationships. Essentially, it is Little Fuzzy told from the point of view of the Fuzzies rather than that of the humans.

After these two official sequels, the original third book by Piper himself, Fuzzies and Other People, offers an alternative future wherein Little Fuzzy himself is separated from Jack Holloway and introduces a band of Fuzzies led by Wise One to the combined society. It explores the deepening relationships between the characters already introduced in Piper's first two books, and shows how the Fuzzies fit in with the humans on Zarathustra.

Characters

Humans
Jack Holloway – Protagonist: Sunstone prospector who discovers the Fuzzies.
Ben Rainsford – Xenobiologist, first scientist to meet the Fuzzies. Later appointed Planetary Governor.
Gerd van Riebeek – Company Xenobiologist. Quits CZC to join Jack.
Ruth Ortheris – Company psychologist and Federation spy.
George Lunt – Constabulary lieutenant.
Victor Grego  – Chartered Zarathustra Company C.E.O.
Juan Jimenez – Company naturalist.
Gustavus Adolphus "Gus" Brannhard – Lawyer and hunter.  Defended Jack for murder.
Leonard Kellogg – Killed the Fuzzy known as Goldilocks.  Charged with murder.
Leslie Coombes – Chartered Zarathrustra Company lawyer.  Defended Kellogg.
Ernst Mallin – Chief company psychologist.
Frederic Pendarvis – Chief Justice of the Zarathustra Court system. Determined that Fuzzies are sapient beings.

Fuzzies
Little Fuzzy – the first Fuzzy discovered
Mamma Fuzzy – dominant female of Little Fuzzy's band
Baby Fuzzy – Mamma Fuzzy's toddler
Goldilocks – Fuzzy murdered by Leonard Kellogg
Cinderella - one of Jack Holloway's Fuzzies
Mike - one of Jack Holloway's Fuzzies
Mitzy - one of Jack Holloway's Fuzzies
Ko-Ko – so named for his almost ceremonial method of beheading zaktu
Id – one of Ruth and Gerd van Riebeck's Fuzzies
Syndrome – one of Ruth and Gerd van Riebeck's Fuzzies
Complex – one of Ruth and Gerd van Riebeck's Fuzzies
Superego – one of Ruth and Gerd van Riebeck's Fuzzies
Diamond – Fuzzy attached to Victor Grego
Starwatcher – leader of the Upland Fuzzies
Wise One – leader of the band Little Fuzzy falls in with
Allan Quartermain – one of Gus Brannhard's Fuzzies
Natty Bumppo – one of Gus Brannhard's Fuzzies

Origins
During a book signing at Strand Book Store, Piper alleged that the Little Fuzzy series was inspired by an acquaintance named Kevin "Fuzzy" Sheffield, whom Piper first met in a literary club in central Oregon. When asked about Sheffield, Piper described him as "a bizarre character, capable of writing little more than a couple of legible remarks in each letter. While I'm sure he's full of insight and great ideas, it seems impossible to effectively communicate with him on a conventional human level...terribly nice fellow however."

References

External links 
 
 Little Fuzzy at the Internet Archive
 
 The Fuzzy Story, history of the book series on The H. Beam Piper Memorial Archive

1962 American novels
1962 science fiction novels
Novels by H. Beam Piper
American science fiction novels
Avon (publisher) books
Novels set on fictional planets
Novels about extraterrestrial life
Novels about imperialism
Public domain books